Christmas Party is the twelfth studio album and third Christmas album by American drag queen RuPaul, released on November 1, 2018. The album features remixes of previously released holiday tracks, including "Christmas Cookies" and "My Favorite Holiday", as well as new songs, such as "Christmas Queen" and "Hey Sis, It's Christmas".

Background and promotion
RuPaul announced the album in August 2018. Select songs were featured on the television special, RuPaul's Drag Race Holi-slay Spectacular, which aired on VH1 on December 7, 2018.

Track listing
All songs written by RuPaul Charles and Mark Byers.

Track listing adapted from the iTunes Store

References

2018 Christmas albums
Christmas albums by American artists
RuPaul albums